James Madison High School is the name of the following high schools in the United States:

 James Madison High School (California), San Diego, California
 James Madison High School (Brooklyn), New York City
 James Madison High School (Dallas), Texas
 James Madison High School (San Antonio, Texas)
 James Madison High School (Fairfax County, Virginia)
 James Madison High School (Milwaukee), Wisconsin
 James Madison Memorial High School, Madison, Wisconsin
 James Madison High School online, Ashworth College, Norcross, Georgia

See also
 Madison High School (disambiguation)